Prevale may refer to:

Locations
 Prevale, Litija, a settlement in Municipality of Litija, Slovenia
 Prevale (Žalna), a hamlet of Žalna in the Municipality of Grosuplje, Slovenia
 Prevale, a valley south of Mount Lamovšek in Palčje in the Municipality of Pivka, Slovenia
 Prevale, a valley south of Kaludernik Hill in Kal in the Municipality of Pivka, Slovenia
 Prevale, a valley southwest of Jamno in the Municipality of Bednja, Croatia

People
 Prevale (DJ), Italian disc jockey, record producer, remixer, and radio host